The Laura Davies Invitational was a women's professional golf tournament on the Ladies European Tour that took place at Brocket Hall GC in England.

Winners

Source:

References

External links
Ladies European Tour

Former Ladies European Tour events
Golf tournaments in England